Daur Akhvlediani Stadium is the central stadium of Gagra city in Georgia. It is located on Nartaa Avenue. During the Abkhaz–Georgian conflict the stadium was seriously damaged and ceased to function. In 2007, it was reconstructed and 1,500 plastic benches were installed and drainage works carried out on the football field. The stadium was reopened on July 10, 1997, and was named after the hero of Abkhazia, Daur Akhvlediani.

2016 ConIFA World Football Cup
During the 2016 ConIFA World Football Cup the Daur Akhvlediani Stadium hosted 12 games, 6 group stage games and 6 of the 8 placement games, as one of the 2 venues for the tournament, the other being the Dinamo Stadium in Sukhumi.

References 

Sports venues in Georgia (country)
CONIFA World Football Cup stadiums
Football venues in Abkhazia